Suleiman Nyambui (born February 13, 1953) is a former track athlete from Tanzania who specialized in various long-distance disciplines. Nyambui won the bronze medal at the 1978 All-Africa Games, the silver medal in 5000 metres at the 1980 Summer Olympics, and finished first at three consecutive marathons between 1987 and 1988. He holds multiple indoor national records of Tanzania in athletics.

Running career

Early life
Nyambui had dropped out of school after primary education. He became a fisherman in Ukerewe District in Mwanza Region, where his potential as a good athlete was spotted by the Region's Athletic Organization.  The organization helped in his training and afforded him facilities and guidance in making him a national and international athlete. He also had joined the Tanzania National Service before he went to train as a teacher.  He taught school at Bukumbi (20 miles from Mwanza City) before moving to the United States to study for his bachelor's and master's degrees at the University of Texas at El Paso (UTEP). Then he took a contract to train Bahraini athletes along with Canadian coaches Craig Taylor and Greg Peters from 1996-1998. After that he moved back to Tanzania.

Collegiate
He attended UTEP from 1978 to 1982, where, as an older athlete (he was 29 when he graduated), he won four straight NCAA titles in the 10,000 meters, one of only five Division I men to ever accomplish such a feat, and the only Division I man to win four straight indoor 1 mile championships. He also won three straight NCAA titles in the 5,000 meters while at UTEP and was the 1980 NCAA Cross Country champion. In a memorable Millrose Games race in New York in February 1981, Nyambui broke the world indoor 5,000 meter record with a 13:20.4, just ahead of Alberto Salazar who broke the American indoor 5,000 meter record.

Post-collegiate
Nyambui would go on to represent Tanzania in the men's 5000 metre race at the 1980 Summer Olympics, where he finished second behind only Miruts Yifter. After running shorter-distance races, Nyambui would go on to run several marathons, winning the Berlin Marathon on two occasions and the Stockholm Marathon in 1988.

References

External links
sports-reference

1953 births
People from Mara Region
Living people
Tanzanian male long-distance runners
Tanzanian male marathon runners
Athletes (track and field) at the 1974 British Commonwealth Games
Athletes (track and field) at the 1978 Commonwealth Games
Commonwealth Games competitors for Tanzania
Athletes (track and field) at the 1980 Summer Olympics
Olympic athletes of Tanzania
Olympic silver medalists for Tanzania
University of Texas at El Paso alumni
UTEP Miners men's track and field athletes
College men's track and field athletes in the United States
Medalists at the 1980 Summer Olympics
Berlin Marathon male winners
Olympic silver medalists in athletics (track and field)
African Games bronze medalists for Tanzania
African Games medalists in athletics (track and field)
Athletes (track and field) at the 1978 All-Africa Games